Hezamara is a village in the Mohanpur subdivision of the West Tripura district in Tripura, India.  The village is located between Sidhai-Mohanpur and Simna on the main road.  Hezamara also serves as a link to the town of Khowai in Khowai subdivision.

The people are mainly Tripuris.  The main economic activities are agriculture and small businesses, most related to the nearby rubber and tea plantations.

The headquarters of the Hezamara Rural Development Block are located here; the present Block Development Officer (BDO) is Gourbindu Das.

See also
 Khumulwng, the headquarters of TTAADC.

Offices
 Hezamara ICDS Project
 Hezamara
 Hezamara
 Barakathal

Cities and towns in West Tripura district